Voinémont is a commune in the Meurthe-et-Moselle department in north-eastern France.

Geography
The village lies in the north-western part of the commune, on the right bank of the river Madon, which forms all of the commune's southern and western borders.

See also
 Communes of the Meurthe-et-Moselle department

References

Communes of Meurthe-et-Moselle